Aron Streit, Inc. (sold under the name Streit's) is a kosher food company founded in Manhattan, New York City, best known for its matzo. It is the only family-owned and operated matzo company in the United States, and distributes matzo in select international markets. Streit's and its major competitor, New Jersey based Manischewitz, together hold about 40 percent of the US matzo market.

The factory follows strict kosher laws. Only shomer Shabbat (Sabbath-observing) Jews are allowed to touch the dough. However, once the dough is baked, people of any religion and non-shomer Shabbat Jews are allowed to touch the matzo. The entire process of making the matzo is under Rabbinic supervision. During Passover, Jews are not allowed to eat leavened bread, so the dough must be baked within 18 minutes before it has had time to rise. If the dough sits for longer than this, it is considered chametz – no longer kosher for Passover – and must be discarded.

History
The company was founded in 1916 by Aron Streit, a Jewish immigrant from Austria who had made matzo there in the late 1800s. Its first factory was on Pitt Street in the Lower East Side of Manhattan. There, Streit and his business associate Rabbi Weinberger made each piece of matzo by hand. In 1925, with the growing number of Jewish immigrants congregating in the Lower East Side, Streit, along with his two sons, Jack and Irving, moved his business to nearby 150  Rivington Street. Soon thereafter they bought the adjacent buildings, where the company  operated for 90 years, before moving in 2015.

Lower East Side factory
Streit's  matzo factory, along with Katz's Delicatessen and Yonah Schimmel's Knish Bakery, was a surviving piece of the Lower East Side's Jewish heritage. At the turn of the 20th century, Jews, along with other European immigrants, were crammed into the many unsanitary tenements of the Lower East Side. In 1915 they made up 60 percent of the Lower East Side population. Because of the large Jewish presence, Jewish-centric businesses like Streit's opened and flourished. However, because of the poor living conditions, as soon as they financially could, many Jewish families moved out of the tenements to other areas in New York City, namely uptown and Brooklyn, slowly making Streit's a relic of the past.

New factory
Since the 1980s the Lower East Side has experienced hyper-gentrification. The neighborhood is now a burgeoning area with rising rents. The Streit family even considered at one point opening a café or bar that serves matzo, to go with the Lower East Side's new nightlife scene.

On December 20, 2007, it was announced that the factory had been listed for sale for $25 million. The Streit's family cited noise complaints, congested streets, and their desire to modernize its equipment as the reasons for their eventual move. Its realtor, Massey Knakel Realty Services, commented "the building will most likely be torn down and converted into luxury condominiums."

Midtown East-based Cogswell Realty bought the factory for $30.5 million in 2015. Cogswell closed on the properties, which together span roughly 50,000 square feet, in May 2015. Cogswell Lee Development and Gluck+, which is also the project's architect, are developing the condo building, and plan to festoon the lobby with Streit's memorabilia

The new Streit's factory at 171 Route 303, Orangeburg, New York, replaced the factory in Manhattan and warehouse and dry pack facility in Moonachie, New Jersey. Bag-and-box mixes like the matzo ball and soup mix, potato pancake mix, and most of the other side items had been made in New Jersey for years.

Products
Besides matzo, Streit's produces many other kosher products under its name. They also operate a separate label of foods called Ethnic Delights, which is mainly condiments and seasonings.

List of Products
Year Round Products
Matzo
Lightly Salted
Unsalted
Flour/Water
Moonstrip
Egg/Onion
Whole Wheat
Matzo Meal
Mediterranean

Noodles
Fine
Medium
Broad
Bows
Medley
Flakes
Barley
Toasted Barley

Soup Mixes
Mushroom-Barley
Split Pea
Variety
Minestrone
Lima Bean
Cup A Soup
Beef Noodle
Chicken Noodle
Mushroom Barley
Garden Vegetable
Chili/Bean
Split/Pea
Tomato/Couscous
Couscous

Assorted Matzo Products
Matzo Ball Mix
Onion Soup Mix
Matzo Ball Soup Mix
Vegetable Soup Mix
Stuffing Mix
Soup Nuts

Potato Products
Potato starch
Potato Kugel
Potato Pancake Mix
Vegetable Potato Pancake Mix
Ready to Serve Canned Soups
Chunky Chicken Noodle
Chicken Consommé
Hearty Vegetable
Mushroom & Barley
Minestrone

Wafers
Vanilla
Chocolate
Lemon

Dessert Jel
Tropical/Punch
Pineapple/Orange
Strawberry/Banana
Strawberry/Cranberry

Hanukkah Products
Candles
Milk Chocolate Coins
Dark Chocolate Coins

Specialty
Kishka
Vegetable Quiche
Fried Rice
Old Fashion Farfel
Bag n' Bake
Honey-Glazed Bag n' Bake
Barbecue Bag n' Bake
Griddle Mix
Blueberry Pancake Mix
Chicken Flavored Rice with Vermicelli
Beef Falvored Rice with Vermicelli
Brown Gravy
Onion Gravy
Family Skillet Dinner - Chili
Family Skillet Dinner - Pasta Sauce
Sugar Free Chocolate Syrup
Chow Mein Noodles
CouscousKosher for Passover Products
Matzo
Passover Matzo
Egg Matzo
Whole Wheat
Schmura
Meal
Farfel
Cake Meal

Macaroons
Coconut
Chocolate
Almond
Brownie Crunch
Chocolate Chip
Bananarama
Chocolate Chocolate Chip
Honey Nut

Cookies
Chocolate Chip
Jelly Tart
Chocolate Nut
Diet

Kichel
Egg Kichel
Diet Kichel
Jumbo Kichel

Mandel Toast
Marble Mandel
Plain Mandel
Almond Mandel
Chocolate Nut Mandel

Mandel Loaf
Chocolate Chip
Cinnamon Raisin
Potato Chips
Salted
Unsalted
Salt Ripple

Cake Mixes
Sponge
Honey
Chocolate
Coffee
Chocolate Chip Loaf
Chocolate Chip Crumb
Chocolate Brownie
Chocolate Cupcake
Vanilla Cupcake
Honey Raisin Muffin
Blueberry Muffin

Chocolates
Lollycones
Chocolate Covered Macaroons
Milk Chocolate CarmelCashew Clusters
Milk Chocolate Covered Matzo
Festival Pop
Chocolate Covered Egg Matzo
Thin Mints
Pepper Mints
Almond Krunch

Condiments
Mayonnaise
Lite Mayonnaise
Ketchup
Apple Sauce
Apple Sauce-Unsweetened
Honey
Brown Gravy
Onion Gravy
Family Skillet Dinner

Dessert Jel
Tropical/Punch
Pineapple/Orange
Strawberry/Banana
Strawberry/Cranberry
Preserves
Strawberry
Cherry
Orange
Apricot
Raspberry

Cup/Farfel Soup
Vegetable
Chicken
Onion
Tomato/Beef

Pickled Products
Manhattan Style Pickles
Sweet and Sour Mushrooms
Hungarian Style Onions
Sweet and Sour Pattypan Squash

Gourmet Cake Mix
Fudge Brownie
Chocolate
Coffee
Honey
Chocolate Chip Cookie Mix
Chocolate Fudge Cookie Mix

Assorted Products
Kishke
Vegetable Quiche
Bag n' Bake
Honey-Glazed Bag n' Bake
Barbecue Bag n' Bake
Stuffing Mix
Potato Pancake
Vegetable Potato Pancake
Potato Kugel
Vegetable Soup Mix withMatzo Ball Mix
Onion Soup Mix with MatzoBall Mix
Matzo Ball & Soup Mix
Potato Starch
Muesli Cereal
Griddle Mix
Blueberry Pancake Mix
Soup Nuts
Mashed Potatoes in a Cup
No Salt Potato Pancake Mix
Passover Noodles with ChickenFlavor Sauce
Passover Noodles with MushroomFlavor Sauce
Ethnic Delight Products
Manhattan Style Pickles with Hot Peppers
Three Color Peppers
Black Peppercorns
Chicken Seasoning
Garlic & Herb Seasoning
Organic Herb Salt
Roasted Garlic
Sea Salt
Green Olive Spread
Black Olive Spread
Pesto Sauce
Garlic Aioli with Dill
Sun Dried Tomatoes
Sun Dried Tomato Morsels

See also
 Yehuda Matzos
 Manischewitz

References

External links
 

1916 establishments in New York (state)
Baking mixes
Food and drink companies established in 1916
Food production companies based in New York City
Kosher food
Matzo
Passover foods
Family-owned companies of the United States